Ana Maria Roqica (born February 2, 1988) is a Fijian rugby sevens player. She is a member of the Fiji women's national rugby sevens team to the 2016 Summer Olympics.

Roqica was named in the Fijiana team to the 2020 Summer Olympics when she was selected as the 13th player after Luisa Tisolo pulled out due to injury. She won a bronze medal at the event. She has captained the Fijiana side since being named captain in 2011. She also captained them at the Rio Olympics.

Roqica has won gold at the 2011 and 2015 Pacific Games. She was selected for the Fijiana squad to the 2021 Rugby World Cup in New Zealand.

References

External links

 Ana Roqica  at 2020 Tokyo
 

1988 births
Rugby sevens players at the 2016 Summer Olympics
Medalists at the 2020 Summer Olympics
Olympic bronze medalists for Fiji
Olympic medalists in rugby sevens
Olympic rugby sevens players of Fiji
Fiji international rugby sevens players
Fijian female rugby union players
Living people
Place of birth missing (living people)
Rugby sevens players at the 2020 Summer Olympics
Fiji international women's rugby sevens players